Antonio Fillol Granell (3 January 1870 – 15 August 1930) was a Spanish painter in the Social Realist style; known for his depictions of the people and customs of Valencia.

Biography

He was born in Valencia. His father was the owner of a small shoe shop, where he worked when he was a boy, using his spare time to pursue his artistic interests. Eventually, his family reluctantly agreed to allow him to enroll at the Escuela de Bellas Artes de San Carlos, where he studied with Ignacio Camarlench and Vicente March, among others.

He had his first showing at the 1888 Barcelona Universal Exposition and won a prize of 500 Pesetas, which seems to have reconciled his family to his chosen career.

In 1895, his painting "The Glory of the People" won a Gold Medal at the National Exhibition of Fine Arts. At the exhibition of 1897, he presented "The Human Beast", a scene depicting prostitution. It was severely criticized and he was branded "immoral", although many major cultural figures, such as Benito Pérez Galdós and Vicente Blasco Ibáñez came to his defense. A similar controversy followed his presentation of "The Satyr" in 1906.

In 1903, a grant from the Provincial Council enabled him to study in France and Italy. He later served as a Professor at San Carlos, where he promoted numerous educational reforms, and as President of the "", a group which included Joaquin Sorolla and Julio Peris Brell. In that capacity he provided assistance to local artists and helped establish the "Regional Exposition of Fine Arts" in 1908. He was also an art critic for Blasco Ibáñez's journal, El Radical Diario Republicano. He died in  Castellnovo, aged 60.

Selected paintings

References

Further reading
 José Luis Alcaide, Antonio Fillol Granell (1870-1930): naturalismo radical y modernismo, Ajuntament de València, Delegación de Cultura, 2015

External links 

Antonio Fillol Granell website, with more works, photographs, articles and criticism.

1870 births
1930 deaths
19th-century Spanish painters
Spanish male painters
20th-century Spanish painters
20th-century Spanish male artists
Spanish genre painters
Social realist artists
People from Valencia
19th-century Spanish male artists